Stäket is one of the oldest buildings remaining in Lund. It currently serves as a restaurant which is also called “Stäket”.

External links

Listed buildings in Sweden
Buildings and structures in Lund
Restaurants in Sweden